Yellow Dancer is the fourth studio album by Japanese singer-songwriter Gen Hoshino. It was released on 2 December 2015 in Japan on Speedstar Records. It reached the first place on the Oricon music charts and was certified platinum by Recording Industry Association of Japan.

The album was promoted by three singles – "Jigoku de Naze Warui", serving as the title song for the Sion Sono movie Why Don't You Play in Hell?, double A-sided "Crazy Crazy" / "Sakura no Mori", and "Sun" (theme song for the dorama Kokoro ga Pokitto ne). All charted in the top 5 on the Oricon. The 2013 single "Gag", used as the theme song for the Saint Young Men anime film starring Hoshino as Buddha, didn't make the album.

Track listing

Charts and sales

Weekly charts

Year-end charts

Sales and certifications

References

External links
 Yellow Dancer Special Page

2015 albums
Gen Hoshino albums
Japanese-language albums